Ahuzam, or Ahuzzam is a moshav in southern Israel. Located around five kilometres south of Kiryat Gat, it falls under the jurisdiction of Lakhish Regional Council.

Etymology
The moshav was originally named Ma'agalim  but renamed after the biblical Ahuzam, son of Ashur, the father or founder of Tekoa, who may have lived in this area (1 Book of Chronicles 4:6).

History
Ahuzam was founded on 30 October 1950 by Jewish immigrants from Morocco, members of the Ma'agalim society. It was associated with the Hapoel HaMizrachi movement, but is now a mixed religious and secular community.

References

Moshavim
Lakhish Regional Council
Populated places established in 1950
Populated places in Southern District (Israel)
Moroccan-Jewish culture in Israel